Alpout or Alpaut or Alpaud or Alpouç may refer to:
Alpout, Barda, Azerbaijan
Alpout, Bilasuvar, Azerbaijan
Alpout, Goranboy, Azerbaijan
Alpout, Goychay, Azerbaijan
Alpout, Lachin, Azerbaijan
Alpout, Qazakh, Azerbaijan
Alpout, Ujar, Azerbaijan
Alpout Pervyy, Azerbaijan
Alpout-Udzhar, Azerbaijan